The Billie Creek Covered Bridge is a Burr Arch structure that was built by Joseph J. Daniels in 1895. J.L. Van Fossen supplied the sandstone that makes up the abutments cut from A.E. Fuel's nearby quarry.

History
This bridge was built to replace the open wooden bridge that had been built by famed bridge builder J.A. Britton, just 15 years earlier in 1880. It was built on what was then called the Pikes Peak Ocean to Ocean Highway, what would later become U.S. 36. The bridge was saved because it was later bypassed when the road was rebuilt.

Billie Creek covered bridge was added to the National Register of Historic Places in 1978.

After being bypassed by the main highway it would become a tourist attraction when it became part of Billie Creek Village where it is still open to vehicular traffic and only closed at busy times of the year for traffic control.

See also
 List of Registered Historic Places in Indiana
 Parke County Covered Bridges
 Parke County Covered Bridge Festival

References

External links
Parke County Covered Bridge Festival

Covered bridges on the National Register of Historic Places in Parke County, Indiana
Bridges completed in 1895
Bridges Built by J. J. Daniels
Wooden bridges in Indiana
Burr Truss bridges in the United States